Dushdur (also Romanized as Dūshdūr; also known as Dūsh and Dūshar) is a village in Almalu Rural District, Nazarkahrizi District, Hashtrud County, East Azerbaijan Province, Iran. At the 2006 census, its population was 176, in 28 families.

References 

Towns and villages in Hashtrud County